M. V. Nikesh Kumar (born 7 October 1973) is an Indian journalist from the state of Kerala. He is the managing director of Reporter TV, a Malayalam news channel. As a Communist Party of India (Marxist) candidate, he lost to K. M. Shaji of Indian Union Muslim League in the 2016 Kerala Legislative Assembly election from the Azhikode Constituency, by 2284 votes.

He holds a bachelor's degree in English literature from Mar Ivanios College, Thiruvananthapuram. He started his career as a news reporter in Asianet, later moved onto Indiavision, anchoring various programmes based on contemporary social and political issues. He anchored Newsnight every day at 09:00 PM.

At Reporter TV, he anchors Editor's Hour, a debate show which discusses mostly regional politics. He also anchors the weekly interview programme Close Encounter, in which he interviews the socio-political leaders of Kerala, a hardcore debate. He returned to journalism after a hiatus of 1 year post the 2016 legislative polls and is now anchoring the MV Nikesh Kumar Show.

Nikesh is the youngest son of the late CMP leader and former minister M. V. Raghavan. He is married to Rani Varghese and has two children - Sankaran and Janaki. He was honoured with Ramnath Goenka award for excellence in journalism by the President of India.

References

External links
"formerly with Asianet, has been appointed executive editor (news) at Indiavision"
Ramnath Goenka Excellence in Journalism Awards 2007
Television Federation (KTF)
Nikesh Kumar will start new channel REPORTER
Announcement on launch
Nikesh Kumar as LDF candidate
Nikesh Kumar returns to Journalism after 1 year
CPM Candidate and Media Personality Nikesh Kumar

Journalists from Kerala
Living people
1973 births